The Type 98 20 mm AAG (anti-air gun) tank was a Japanese self-propelled anti-aircraft gun using a twin Soki Type II 20 mm anti-air gun. They were combined with the chassis of the Type 98 Ke-Ni. The gun crew worked from a raised platform with a modest amount of protection from the sides - the twin 20 mm gun fired through a large gun shield gave further protection for the crew from that direction.

In November 1941, development began on an anti-aircraft version of the Type 98 with a 20 mm AA gun. During development of the AA gun tank, the Imperial Japanese Army experimented with various configurations.

Single gun variant

An earlier produced single gun prototype was designated the Type 98 Ta-Se anti-aircraft tank, in November 1941. The name was taken from taikū ('anti-air') sensha ('tank'). It was equipped with a single converted Type 98 20 mm AA machine cannon in a circumferential turret. During trials, it was determined that the chassis used for the Ta-Se was too small to be a stable "firing platform". It did not enter production.

Twin gun version 

The prototype Type 98 20 mm AAG tank was equipped with modified twin Type 2 20 mm AA machine cannons. The guns were similar to the Type 98 anti-aircraft cannon, but these could be elevated to 95 degrees and had a central fire-control system. The rate of fire was 300 rpm, and they had a maximum range of 5,500 m. The gunner sat in the seat right behind the gun. The platform allowed 360 degrees of rotation for both the gunner and the gun. A Type 100 air-cooled inline six-cylinder diesel engine was used to output 130 horsepower. Forward transmission included four stages, with one reverse speed. The Type 98 Ke-Ni chassis and engine, on which the prototype was based, managed a speed of 42 km/h. It also did not enter production.

See also
Type 98 20 mm AA half-track vehicle
20 mm AA machine cannon carrier truck

Notes

References
Taki's Imperial Japanese Army Page - Akira Takizawa

World War II self-propelled anti-aircraft weapons
20 mm artillery
Military vehicles introduced from 1940 to 1944